An appeal is the process in law by which cases are reviewed and parties request a formal change to an official decision.

Appeal may also refer to:

Politics and law 
 Appeal (motion), in parliamentary procedure a challenge of the chair's ruling
 Appeal of 18 June, Charles de Gaulle's 1940 call for French resistance against Nazi Germany
 Mariam Appeal, a political campaign established in 1998
 Criminal appeal, an ancient, private right of criminal prosecution in common-law jurisdictions

Publications and media 
 The Appeal, a novel by John Grisham
 Appeal, an anti-slavery document by abolitionist David Walker
 The Commercial Appeal, a daily newspaper in Memphis, Tennessee
 Appeal to Reason (newspaper), a weekly left-wing political newspaper in the US until 1922
The Appeal, English title of the 1970 animated short film by Ryszard Czekała, 
The Appeal, online news site
The Appeal (newspaper)

Other uses 
 Appeal Isimirie, Nigerian taekwondo practitioner
 Appeal (cricket), a request to an umpire for a ruling on whether a cricket batter is out
 Appeal play, in baseball when a member of the defensive team calls the attention of an umpire to an infraction
 Rhetorical appeals, devices used in rhetoric to persuade an audience, namely ethos, logos, and pathos
 Sex appeal, the quality of arousing attraction on the basis of sexual desire

See also 
 
 Appellate Division (disambiguation)
 Justice of Appeal (disambiguation)
 Lord of Appeal (disambiguation)
 Board of Patent Appeals and Interferences, former administrative law body of the United States Patent and Trademark Office
 Informal fallacy, reasoning error through appeal to something other than logical argument
 Preference, choosing between alternatives
 Taste (sociology), an individual's personal and cultural patterns of choice and preference